Andrew Belton (17 April 1882 – 1970) was a British Army officer and veteran of campaigns in South Africa and Morocco. He was an early exponent of the use of aircraft for military purposes, enrolling at the Chicago School of Aviation in April, 1911. He was an entrepreneur who registered a number of companies in the newly established Irish Free State.

Military career
Following the deaths of two of his brothers during the Second Boer War, and though under age, Belton enlisted and saw service in Africa. On his return to England, he became aware of the developing military dispute in Morocco, subsequently known as the First Moroccan Crisis. Having apparently resigned his military commission, he assisted Abdelhafid, Caliph of Marrakesh pretender to the sultanate, in overthrowing his brother Abdelaziz, then sultan of Morocco, in a coup d'état known as the Hafidiya. This is how Belton acquired the title Kaid, or Commander.

During the Spanish Civil War, he was arrested in Seville having crossed the border from Gibraltar. He was instrumental in establishing the Independent Overseas Command of the Legion of Frontiersmen in Africa.

Broadcasting enquiry
In 1924, Belton was at the centre of an investigation concerning allegations of Government corruption in the Irish Free State. He came to public attention when a letter from him to the Irish Postmaster General, J. J. Walsh was revealed by Walsh. Accusations of impropriety centered around the business relationship between Belton and Deputy Darrell Figgis, and Wireless Broadcasting concessions, which led to Belton almost gaining control of the Irish Broadcasting Company. The ensuing scandal finished Figgis' political career.

Death
Andrew Belton died in South Africa in 1970 at the age of 88. He was survived by his third wife, Kathleen Belton née Mossop, who was a niece of the late Dean F.C Clayton, and also a son and daughter who lived in the south of England.

References

External links
 Kaid Belton, The King Maker, and his bride, Mima Babin Undated wedding photograph.

1882 births
1970 deaths
People from Cleator Moor
Moroccan military personnel
Legion of Frontiersmen members
British colonial army officers
British Yeomanry soldiers
British Army personnel of the Second Boer War
Royal Fusiliers officers
British Army personnel of World War I
Knights of the Order of St. Sylvester
Date of death missing
Place of death missing